Duchess of Kent is the principal courtesy title used by the wife of the Duke of Kent. There have been four titles referring to Kent since the 18th century. The current duchess is Katharine, the wife of Prince Edward. He inherited the dukedom on 25 August 1942 upon the death of his father, Prince George, the fourth son of George V.

History
Henry Grey, 12th Earl of Kent since 1702 (of the eighth creation in the peerage of England) was raised to the peerage of Great Britain in 1706 under Queen Anne as Marquess of Kent, Earl of Harold and Viscount Goderich, then as Duke of Kent in 1710. In 1694, he had married Jemima Crew, who became Countess, Marchioness and then Duchess of Kent in 1702, 1706 and 1710 respectively. She died in 1728. In 1729, he married Sophia Bentinck, who died exactly a year after he did. The dukedom, marquessate and earldom of Kent all became extinct, as the duke had survived all of his sons and had no male collateral heirs. However, two subsidiary titles (the barony of Lucas of Crudwell and the marquessate of Grey) passed to his granddaughter, Jemima Yorke.

The Prince Edward Augustus was created Duke of Kent and Strathearn in the peerage of Great Britain by his father, George III, in 1799. In 1818, he married Princess Victoria of Saxe-Coburg-Saalfeld, the daughter of Duke Francis and former regent of the Principality of Leiningen. They had one daughter, Princess Alexandrina Victoria, in 1819. The duke died with no male heir in 1820, while the duchess died in 1861. She never married again, but there were rumours (unproven) of an affair with John Conroy.

Grand Duchess Maria Alexandrovna of Russia became Countess of Kent in 1874 on her marriage to The Prince Alfred Ernest Albert, who had received the earldom of Kent in the peerage of the United Kingdom from his mother eight years earlier. The couple were more commonly known by their higher titles of Duke and Duchess of Edinburgh, then as Duke and Duchess of Saxe-Coburg and Gotha. The duke died in 1900, and the duchess in 1920. They had survived their only son, Alfred, in 1899.

The Prince George Edward Alexander Edmund was created Duke of Kent by his father George V in 1934, some weeks in advance of his wedding to Princess Marina of Greece and Denmark. She was a first cousin of the future royal consort Prince Philip, Duke of Edinburgh. George died in 1942, leaving his peerage titles to his six-year-old son, Prince Edward. Marina continued to be styled "The Duchess of Kent" until Edward's wedding, and was then styled "Princess Marina, Duchess of Kent" until her own death in 1968.

Katharine Worsley married Prince Edward in 1961 and has remained Duchess of Kent ever since.

List of titleholders

Duchesses of Kent (Great Britain, 1710–1740)
Subsidiary titles: Countess of Harold, Viscountess Goderich, Baroness Lucas of Crudwell.

| Jemima CrewCrew family1710–1728
| 
| 1675–daughter of Thomas Crew and Anne Armine
| 1694Henry Grey, 12th Earl of Kent6 children
| 2 July 1728aged 31 or 32
|-
| Sophia BentinckBentinck family1729–1740
| 
| 4 April 1701–daughter of William Bentinck, 1st Earl of Portland, and Jane Martha Temple
| 1729Henry Grey, 1st Duke of Kent2 children
| 5 June 1741aged 40
|-
|}

Duchess of Kent and Strathearn (Great Britain, 1818–1820)
Subsidiary titles: Countess of Dublin (Ireland).

| Princess Victoria of Saxe-Coburg-SaalfeldHouse of Saxe-Coburg-Saalfeld1818–1820
| 
| 17 August 1786Coburg–daughter of Francis, Duke of Saxe-Coburg-Saalfeld and Countess Augusta of Reuss-Ebersdorf
| 29 May 1818Prince Edward, Duke of Kent and Strathearn1 daughter
| 16 March 1861aged 74
|-
|}

Countess of Kent (United Kingdom, 1874–1900)
Other titles: Duchess of Edinburgh, Countess of Ulster.

| Grand Duchess Maria Alexandrovna of RussiaHouse of Holstein-Gottorp-Romanov1874–1900
|
| 17 October 1853Alexander Palace, Russian Empire–daughter of Alexander II and Marie of Hesse and by Rhine
| 23 January 1874Prince Alfred, Duke of Edinburgh5 children
| 24 October 1920aged 67
|-
|}

Duchesses of Kent (United Kingdom, 1934–present)
Subsidiary titles: Countess of St Andrews, Baroness Downpatrick.

| Princess Marina of Greece and DenmarkHouse of Glücksburg1934–1942
| 
| 13 December 1906Athens, Greece–daughter of Prince Nicholas and Grand Duchess Elena
| 29 November 1934Prince George, Duke of Kent3 children
| 27 August 1968, aged 61
|-
| Katharine WorsleyWorsley family1961–present
|
| 22 February 1933Hovingham Hall, Yorkshire–daughter of Sir William Worsley, 4th Baronet, and Joyce Brunner
| 8 June 1961Prince Edward3 children
|  now  old
|-
|}

Possible future duchesses
Edward and Katharine's eldest son George Windsor, married Sylvana Tomaselli in 1988. They are currently known by the courtesy titles Earl and Countess of St Andrews. As George is three generations removed from the crown he is not a prince. Upon his accession Sylvana would be styled Her Grace The Duchess of Kent.

George and Sylvana's only son Edward, born in 1988, is currently unmarried.

References

 
British monarchy
Lists of duchesses